Soroksár SC is a Hungarian football club located in the Soroksár district of Budapest, Hungary. The team's colors are yellow and black.

History
On 20 June 2017, Péter Lipcsei was appointed as the manager of the club.

References

Current squad
.

External links 
  
 Magyarfuball

Football clubs in Hungary
Association football clubs established in 1905
1905 establishments in Hungary